Denhardt is a surname. Notable people with the surname include:

Clemens Denhardt (1852–1928), German explorer
Gustav Denhardt (1856–1917), German explorer
Henry Denhardt (1876–1937), American politician and retired brigadier general
Robert Denhardt (born 1942), American scholar and author

See also 
Dennhardt